Samuel Walkey (10 July 187129 March 1953) was an English bank inspector, who used his spare time when travelling to write, and became a prolific author of boy's adventure fiction. Walkey wrote at least sixteen novels and hundreds of magazine stories. He contributed stories to magazines for more than 40 years.

Early life
Samuel Walkey was born on 10 July 1871 at Kilkhampton, Cornwall, England. He was the son of Joshua Walkey (27 October 18281884), a draper. 
  
Walkey entered the Devon and Cornwall Bank as a clerk at 16. He was a hard worker and was soon promoted. The 1891 census found Walkey boarding with the White family at 26 Fore Street, in Torpoint, across the river from Plymouth.

Adult life
Sometime in the 1890s he became a bank-inspector and had to travel all over the West Country. Walkey was already a bank-inspector when he married Kathleen Agnes White (27 March 187315 June 1949), the daughter of draper Seymore White, whom Walkey was boarding with in Torpoint for the 1881 census. The couple were married at St. James's Church in Torpoint on 6 September 1897.

The couple had three children:
Joyce Morwenna (26 July 18983 February 1988), who was the executor of her father's will.
Howarth Seymour (13 May 190020 August 1970), who pursued a Naval Career, passing the exam for the Osborne Naval College at age 14. and being appointed Rear Admiral in 1956.
John Christopher (18 October 19036 October 1989), who joined the Royal Engineers, held various command positions, including Engineer-in-Chief at the War Office, before retiring with the rank of Major General in 1957.

Walkey was appointed branch manager of the Devon and Cornwall Bank in Penzance in 1901. The Devon and Cornwall Bank was acquired by Lloyds in 1906. In 1908 Walkey was promoted to be manager of the new Lloyds bank at Newton Abbot, and the 1911 census found him visiting his widowed mother at his brother-in-law's house in Manchester, still a bank manager with Lloyds. He was still at Newton Abbott as he was crediting to help resolve a dispute between Lloyds and the Urban District Council over highway encroachment by the bank.
  
Walkey left Newton Abbot in 1921. In 1924, a press notice about a will for which he was executor says that he is with Lloyds Bank at Salisbury, In the 1939 register Walkey records his profession as Staff Controller Lloyds Bank, retired.

Writing
Lofts states that Walkey took up writing boy's stories to while away his evenings alone. Sir Arthur Quiller-Couch, a fellow Cornishman, saw his writing and introduced him to Max Pemberton, until recently the editor of Chums in 1895. Adcock states that his wife encouraged him to start writing, but Walkey had his first serial in Chums two years before he got married.

Walkey wrote both boys' adventure fiction for a juvenile audience, and stirring romance fiction for an adult audience. However, by a huge measure, the bulk of his output was juvenile fiction. Adcock states that Walkey wrote two adult-oriented adventure novels for Cassell's, whereas Kemp and Mitchell state that Walkey published sixteen volumes of adventure fiction between 1897 and 1935. 
 
In many cases Walkey published his stories as serials first, and then as novels. For example, in April 1901 Cassell and Co. were advertising that With Redskins on the Warpath was starting in Chums (calling it a splendid new serial). By October 1901 Cassell and Co were selling it as a book.

Books
The following list of books is from the collated library catalogues on the Jisc Library Hub Discover site. No titles by Walker were available on Project Gutenberg on 12 May 2020. Only three of his books are available in online versions, as noted below.

Example of illustrations for a Walkey book
Paul Hardy was frequently an illustrator for Walkey after he illustrated Rogues of the Fiery Cross. This was Walkey's second serial story, and the second novel he published. It appeared in Chums in the 18961897 volume and it was a huge success. It was illustrated by Hardy, as was almost all of Walkey's subsequent work in Chums. The story was almost immediately published as a book by Cassell & Co., London in 1897 with sixteen full-page illustrations (courtesy of the British Library, as shown below:

Magazine stories
The following list shows Walkey's publications in Magazines from November 1907, some twelve years after his first known serial in 1895. Walkey averaged just under ten stories a year from 1908 to 1917, so a full list would probably list another one hundred stories. Most of the stories are juvenile fiction, but some of the stories are intended for an adult audience.

Later life
Walkey's promotions at Lloyds had taken him from the West Country, but he returned there when he retired, settling at Westcliffe Road in Dawlish, Devonshire, England. Kathleen died first, on 15 June 1949. Walkey himself followed four years later, dying on 29 March 1953 in Teignmouth, Devonshire.

Assessment
Turner states that Chums was chiefly remembered (when he was writing in 1948) for the pirate stories of Walkey and others. He notes that Walkey contributed his fast-moving tales of villainy for more than thirty years. Cullingford noted that writers like Walkey had a large and devoted following. The Cornishman noted that his stories were read with zest by the boys of England.

Thomas told how on a visit to a boarding school, he had asked the boys if they had ever heard of Walkey; A shout went up"Rather!". Thomas said that his own reputation was increased merely because he could tell boys a little bit about Walkey. Perhaps Walkey is best assessed by his impact. Geoffrey Trease wrote that Walkey's Hurrah for Merry Sherwood! was his favourite story, and that it was therefore not surprising that the first boys' story he wrote was Bows against the Barons (1934). Trease's boyhood impression of the French Revolution were all gained from a Walkey story about the reign of terror. He re-read the story and concluded that Walkey wrote quite well. In a tongue-in-cheek review of Yo Ho! for the Spanish Main, Herbert advised boys not to buy the book as it would take away their appetite for cube root and the least common denominator and the pluperfect tense. He maintained that Mr. Walkey and his publisher were not sedate enough companions for the young not a sedate enough companion for the young.

Notes

References

1871 births
1953 deaths
English writers
19th-century English writers
20th-century English novelists
English children's writers
English novelists
English short story writers
Victorian novelists